P1X3L (pronounced as Pixel) is a Hong Kong Cantopop boy group formed through ViuTV's reality talent show King Maker II in 2019. The group consists of three members: Phoebus Ng, George Au and Marco Ip. They debuted on 4 January 2021 with the first single "Braceless".

Members

Discography

Singles

Filmography

Television shows

Dramas

Videography

Music videos

Awards and nominations

References

External links

Hong Kong boy bands
Cantopop musical groups
Musical groups established in 2021
2021 establishments in Hong Kong
Musical trios
Hong Kong idols 
King Maker II contestants
Universal Music Hong Kong artists
MakerVille artists